This is a list of islands of New Brunswick. The province of New Brunswick is composed of mainland New Brunswick and is lined with islands of various magnitudes.

List of islands

See also

List of islands of Canada
Geography of New Brunswick

References

New Brunswick
Islands